Eadley Graeme Stoney  (born 1 April 1940) is a former Australian politician.

Life 
Born in Mirboo North, Victoria, he was educated at Scotch College before becoming a farmer, alpine tourism operator and newspaper proprietor. Graeme was a "crack" rider in both "The Man From Snowy River" films and appeared in riding sequences in several other High Country films and documentaries. He was a member of  many  Mansfield community groups including  Mansfield SES search and rescue mounted group, Boorolite CFA, VFF, Apex, Bindaree Retirement Village and  Mansfield Autistic Centre. Among  several  business interests he was marketing manager for Mansfield Seeds which traded  small seeds throughout Australia and grew seed in Mansfield for growers in Oregon USA. Graeme was heavily involved in the fight to retain Alpine grazing and during the 1980's organized several large protests and  rallies. One such event which turned political  was the Nunawading by election in 1985. The bitter fall out from that event culminated in him being summoned to the Bar of the Legislative Council to explain the Cattlemen's involvement in the Byelection. In a tumultuous day the numbers to actually invite him to  appear the bar were lost and he was left standing in Queens Hall. In 1992 Graeme was elected to the Victorian Legislative Council as the Liberal member for Central Highlands Province. He remained in Parliament until 2006.

Stoney was appointed a Member of the Order of Australia in the 2023 Australia Day Honours.

Major parliamentary achievements 
 Chairman of the Kennett Government Rail Trails Committee which cut through the Victorian Railways red tape and oversaw the development of 17 trails in Victoria on disused railway corridors.
 Spokesperson for Forestry and Liberal Party Upper House Whip. Member of various bipartisan parliamentary committees including Road Safety and Environment and Natural Resources.

Present 
 Beef cattle producer including holding state forest grazing licence on Narboorac, Howqua Hills Victoria
 Member Telstra Victorian Rural Advisory Committee
 Author edition three "The Howqua Hills Story" in conjunction with Chris Stoney( Edition one and two), published March 2020
 Involved in management of  Wendy Jubb -Stoney's Flinders Island Gourmet Retreat on Flinders island Bass Strait

Current community service 
 Past president and member, Mansfield Historical Society Museum Building committee
 Vice President, Mansfield Cultural Heritage and Arts Centre
 Life Member, Mansfield Autistic Centre
 Life Member, and past President Mountain Cattlemen's Association of Victoria
 Life Member, Victorian Tourism Industry Association
 Life Member, Mansfield Historical Society

References

1940 births
Living people
Members of the Order of Australia
Liberal Party of Australia members of the Parliament of Victoria
Members of the Victorian Legislative Council
21st-century Australian politicians